Dan Hewitt Owens (born July 5, 1947) is an American actor, director and screenwriter. He has had a film and TV career for over 40 years and has won awards as a film director, screenwriter, producer, and cinematographer.

Early life
Owens was born in Amherst, Texas, in 1947, the son of Bon Hardy (née Chambers) and Floyd Russell "Pete" Owens. Owens grew up in Fort Worth, Texas. He has two brothers. He graduated from R. L. Paschal High School in 1965, where he lettered in football.

Owens served in the United States Marine Corps Reserve from 1966 to 1972.

Career
He began as an actor working on stage continuing to film, episodic television, soap operas, and TV commercials. He appeared in LBJ, Our Brand is Crisis, Dark Places, Last Vegas, and Project Puppies for Christmas. With numerous TV credits, he most recently guest starred on Adam Ruins Everything and co-starred on episodes of Parks and Recreation and Criminal Minds.

Filmography

Film

Television

References

External links
 
  Official Website

1947 births
21st-century American male actors
American male film actors
Living people
Male actors from Fort Worth, Texas
American male television actors
People from Lamb County, Texas
United States Marine Corps reservists